The History of the Prophets and Kings ( Tārīkh al-Rusul wa al-Mulūk), more commonly known as Tarikh al-Tabari or Tarikh-i Tabari or The History of al-Tabari  is an Arabic-language historical chronicle completed by the Muslim historian Muhammad ibn Jarir al-Tabari (225–310 AH, 838–923 AD) in 915 AD. It begins with creation, and charts Muslim and Middle Eastern history from the myths and legends associated with the Old Testament through to the history of the Abbasid era, down to the year 915. An appendix or continuation, was written by Abu Abdullah b. Ahmad b. Ja'far al-Farghani, a student of al-Tabari.

Editions

Various editions of the Annals include:
 An edition published under the editorship of M.J. de Goeje in three series comprising 13 volumes, with two extra volumes containing indices, introduction and glossary (Leiden, 1879–1901).
 An edition published under the editorship of Muhammad Abu al-Fadl Ibrahim (1905-1981) in 10 volumes (Cairo: Dar al-Ma'arif, 1960–1969.)
 A Persian digest of this work, made in 963 by the Samanid scholar al-Bal'ami, translated into French by Hermann Zotenberg (vols. i.-iv., Paris, 1867–1874).
 An English translation in 39 volumes (plus index), published by the State University of New York Press from 1985 through 2007. Various editors and 29 translators.  (hc),  (pb), Author: Tabari (various translators), Publisher: SUNY Press

Volumes of the SUNY edition
 Vol. 01 General Introduction and from the Creation to the Flood (Franz Rosenthal)
 Vol. 02 Prophets and Patriarchs (William Brinner)
 Vol. 03 The Children of Israel (William Brinner)
 Vol. 04 The Ancient Kingdoms (Moshe Perlmann)
 Vol. 05 The Sassanids, the Byzantines, the Lakhmids, and Yemen (C. E. Bosworth)
 Vol. 06 Muhammad at Mecca (W. Montgomery Watt and M.V. McDonald)
 Vol. 07 The Foundation of the Community - Muhammad at al-Madina, A. D. 622-626 (M.V. McDonald)
 Vol. 08 The Victory of Islam (Michael Fishbein)
 Vol. 09 The Last Years of the Prophet: The Formation of the State, A.D. 630-632-A.H. 8-11 (Ismail Poonawala)
 Vol. 10 The Conquest of Arabia, A. D. 632-633 - A. H. 11 (Fred M. Donner)
 Vol. 11 The Challenge to the Empires (Khalid Blankinship)
 Vol. 12 The Battle of al-Qadisiyyah and the Conquest of Syria and Palestine (Yohanan Friedmann)
 Vol. 13 The Conquest of Iraq, Southwestern Persia, and Egypt: The Middle Years of 'Umar's Caliphate, A.D. 636-642-A.H. 15-21 (G.H.A. Juynboll)
 Vol. 14 The Conquest of Iran, A. D. 641-643 - A. H. 21-23 (G. Rex Smith)
 Vol. 15 The Crisis of the Early Caliphate: The Reign of Uthman, A. D. 644-656 - A. H. 24-35 (R. Stephen Humphreys)
 Vol. 16 The Community Divided: The Caliphate of Ali I, A. D. 656-657-A. H. 35-36 (Adrian Brockett)
 Vol. 17 The First Civil War: From the Battle of Siffin to the Death of Ali, A. D. 656-661-A. H. 36-40 (G. R. Hawting)
 Vol. 18 Between Civil Wars: The Caliphate of Mu'awiyah 40 A.H., 66 A.D.-60 A.H., 680 A.D. (Michael G. Morony)
 Vol. 19 The Caliphate of Yazid ibn Mu'awiyah, A. D. 680-683 - A. H. 60-64 (I. K. A. Howard)
 Vol. 20 The Collapse of Sufyanid Authority and the Coming of the Marwanids: The Caliphates of Mu'awiyah II and Marwan I (G. R. Hawting)
 Vol. 21 The Victory of the Marwanids, A. D. 685-693-A. H. 66-73 (Michael Fishbein)
 Vol. 22 The Marwanid Restoration: The Caliphate of 'Abd al-Malik: A.D. 693-701 - A.H. 74-81 (Everett K Rowson)
 Vol. 23 The Zenith of the Marwanid House: The Last Years of 'Abd al-Malik and the Caliphate of al-Walid A.D. 700-715-A.H. 81-95 (Martin Hinds)
 Vol. 24 The Empire in Transition: The Caliphates of Sulayman, 'Umar, and Yazid, A. D. 715-724-A. H. 96-105 (Stephan Powers)
 Vol. 25 The End of Expansion: The Caliphate of Hisham, A.D. 724-738-A.H. 105-120 (Khalid Blankinship)
 Vol. 26 The Waning of the Umayyad Caliphate: Prelude to Revolution, A.D. 738-744 - A.H. 121-126 (Carole Hillenbrand)
 Vol. 27 The Abbasid Revolution, A. D. 743-750 - A. H. 126-132 (John Alden Williams)
 Vol. 28 The Abbasid Authority Affirmed: The Early Years of al-Mansur (Jane Dammen McAuliffe)
 Vol. 29 Al-Mansur and al-Mahdi, A.D. 763-786-A.H. 146-169 (Hugh N. Kennedy)
 Vol. 30 The Abbasid Caliphate in Equilibrium: The Caliphates of Musa al-Hadi and Harun al-Rashid, A. D. 785-809 - A. H. 169-192 (C. E. Bosworth)
 Vol. 31 The War Between Brothers, A. D. 809-813 - A. H. 193-198 (Michael Fishbein)
 Vol. 32 The Absolutists in Power: The Caliphate of al-Ma'mun, A.D. 813-33 - A.H. 198-213 (C. E. Bosworth)
 Vol. 33 Storm and Stress Along the Northern Frontiers of the Abbasid Caliphate (C. E. Bosworth)
 Vol. 34 Incipient Decline: The Caliphates of al-Wathig, al-Mutawakkil and al-Muntasir, A.D. 841-863-A.H. 227-248 (Joel L Kraemer)
 Vol. 35 The Crisis of the Abbasid Caliphate (George Saliba)
 Vol. 36 The Revolt of the Zanj, A. D. 869-879 - A. H. 255-265 (David Waines)
 Vol. 37 The Abbasid Recovery: The War Against the Zanj Ends (Philip M Fields)
 Vol. 38 The Return of the Caliphate to Baghdad: The Caliphate of al-Mu'tadid, al-Muktafi and al-Muqtadir, A.D. 892-915 (Franz Rosenthal)
 Vol. 39 Biographies of the Prophet's Companions and Their Successors: al-Tabari's Supplement to His History (Ella Landau-Tasseron)
 Vol. 40 Index (Prepared by Alex V Popovkin under the supervision of Everett K. Rowson)

Content
The main purpose of Tabari was to write history according to the science of narration. That is to say he quotes the narrator without interfering in any way.

Among its content can be found:
 Hadith of the pen and paper
 Information about Zayd al-Khayr
 Information about Utbah ibn Ghazwan
 Information about Ka’b al-Ahbar
 Muhammad ibn Abi Bakr being the first to attack in the killing of Uthman.
 Some hadith regarding Aisha’s age at marriage.
 Slave Zanj rebellion.

Tabari at times draws on the Syriac Julian Romance.

See also
 List of Muslim historians
 List of Sunni books

References

10th-century Arabic books
10th-century encyclopedias
10th-century history books
Middle Eastern chronicles
Biographical dictionaries
History of the Middle East
History of Islam

Iranian literature
Sunni literature
Universal history books

Works by Muhammad ibn Jarir al-Tabari